Ramburiella is a genus of grasshoppers in the family Acrididae and the monotypic tribe Ramburiellini. Species of Ramburiella are found in Africa, Europe, and Asia.

Species
These species belong to the genus Ramburiella:
subgenus Palaeocesa Koçak & Kemal, 2010
(synonym Pallasiella Kirby, 1910)
 Ramburiella bolivari (Kuthy, 1907)
 Ramburiella foveolata Tarbinsky, 1931
 Ramburiella turcomana (Fischer von Waldheim, 1833)
subgenus Ramburiella Bolívar, 1906
 Ramburiella garambana Dirsh, 1964
 Ramburiella hispanica (Rambur, 1838) - type species (as Gryllus hispanicus Rambur)
 Ramburiella signata (Fischer von Waldheim, 1833)

References

External links

 

Gomphocerinae
Acrididae genera
Orthoptera of Africa
Orthoptera of Europe